The DC Extended Universe (DCEU) media franchise has experienced a turbulent history since its inception in 2013, characterized by highly publicized clashes between studio executives and talent, constantly-changing approaches to worldbuilding, and changes in management. Warner Bros. Pictures originally announced plans for a shared universe of live-action films based on the DC Comics, starting with the release of Man of Steel (2013), with director Zack Snyder set to spearhead the franchise. Following the negative reception to Snyder's follow-up film Batman v Superman: Dawn of Justice (2016), Warner Bros. created DC Films, a new division led by Geoff Johns and Jon Berg tasked with overseeing development of the DCEU. DC Films attempted to correct the course of the franchise, culminating in the troubled production and disastrous release of the crossover film Justice League (2017), which significantly deviated from Snyder's original vision.

After the failure of Justice League, Warner Bros. sought to de-emphasize the DCEU's interconnectivity and transition from the Snyder era, releasing a series of solo films while greenlighting live-action films not set in the DCEU. Walter Hamada was hired as the new head of DC Films, replacing Johns and Berg. Under Hamada's leadership, the studio severed ties with several of its leading talent, including Snyder, Superman actor Henry Cavill, and Batman actor Ben Affleck. In 2020, Warner Bros. parent company WarnerMedia launched its HBO Max streaming service, releasing a director's cut of Justice League entitled Zack Snyder's Justice League (2021) following years of pressuring from Snyder's fans. The DCEU expanded to live-action television with HBO Max's Peacemaker (2022–present), helmed by The Suicide Squad (2021) director James Gunn.

In 2022, WarnerMedia completed its merger with Discovery, Inc. to form Warner Bros. Discovery, led by CEO David Zaslav, whose aspirations for the DCEU differed from those of Hamada, leading to his cancellation of Batgirl (2022) and the subsequent ousting of Hamada. After a months-long search for a replacement, Zaslav selected Gunn and Peter Safran to co-lead DC Studios, the successor to DC Films. In January 2023, the duo unveiled their slate of DC films and television series which were to be part of the DC Universe (DCU), a soft reboot and spiritual successor to the DCEU.

Background 
The first feature film based on a character from American comic books published by DC Comics was Superman and the Mole Men (1951), a B-movie distributed by Lippert Pictures and starring George Reeves as Clark Kent / Superman, which served as a backdoor pilot to the Adventures of Superman (1952–1958) television series. In 1967, DC Comics predecessor National Periodical Publications was acquired by Kinney National Company, later known as Warner Communications, Time Warner, and WarnerMedia. Since then, nearly all DC films have been distributed by Warner Bros. Pictures, the flagship film studio of the Warner conglomerate.

In the early 2000s, Warner Bros. was looking to relaunch its Batman and Superman film franchises following the disappointing performances of Batman & Robin (1997) and Superman IV: The Quest for Peace (1987) both critically and commercially. The studio briefly entertained the idea of a Batman vs. Superman (2004) crossover film directed by Wolfgang Petersen from a script by Akiva Goldsman, but these plans never came to fruition and the film was sent to development hell. The studio instead opted to greenlight Batman Begins (2005) and Superman Returns (2006), standalone stories featuring the two characters that the studio hoped would eventually lead to a Batman–Superman crossover. Batman Begins was a critical and commercial success, leading to two sequels which constitute The Dark Knight trilogy: The Dark Knight (2008) and The Dark Knight Rises (2012). By contrast, Superman Returns underperformed at the box office despite positive reviews, and the studio canceled plans for a 2009 sequel.

In February 2007, Warner Bros. hired Michele and Kieran Mulroney to pen a screenplay for a film featuring the Justice League of America. Christian Bale, who starred as Bruce Wayne / Batman in Batman Begins, was not approached to reprise the role, nor was Brandon Routh, who starred as Clark Kent / Superman in Superman Returns. George Miller signed on to direct the film, reportedly titled Justice League Mortal, with the ensemble cast consisting of Armie Hammer as Bruce Wayne / Batman, D. J. Cotrona as Clark Kent / Superman, Adam Brody as Barry Allen / Flash, Santiago Cabrera as Arthur Curry / Aquaman, Common as John Stewart / Green Lantern, Megan Gale as Diana Prince / Wonder Woman, Hugh Keays-Byrne as J'onn J'onzz / Martian Manhunter, and Jay Baruchel as Maxwell Lord. The project was abandoned in January 2008 after the studio failed to secure tax breaks for filming in Australia and the 2007–2008 Writers Guild of America strike hindered progress on the script. It had been intended to launch a full-fledged franchise, with sequels and spin-offs planned.

2008–2016: Zack Snyder 

By June 2008, Warner Bros. was once again seeking to relaunch the Superman film series after the failure of Superman Returns, hearing pitches for a reboot from comic book writers Grant Morrison, Mark Waid, Geoff Johns, Brad Meltzer, and Mark Millar. While discussing the story of The Dark Knight Rises with director Christopher Nolan, screenwriter David S. Goyer shared with him an idea of a Superman film set in a modern context, which Nolan was impressed by and pitched to the studio. On the heels of The Dark Knight critical acclaim and financial success, Warner Bros. quickly hired Goyer to write the film and Nolan to produce. By then, the studio was no longer planning to develop a Batman–Superman team-up film.

In October 2010, Zack Snyder was chosen to direct the Superman reboot. Henry Cavill was announced to star as Clark Kent / Superman in January 2011, and the film was later revealed to be titled Man of Steel (2013). The film was to lay the groundwork for future DC films, containing numerous Easter eggs and references to other DC characters, with the intention of setting up a shared universe of DC characters in film akin to the DC Universe in the comics. Snyder and Nolan considered having Man of Steel share continuity with the Dark Knight trilogy, but ultimately decided against it. Additionally, DC had originally intended for Green Lantern (2011), starring Ryan Reynolds as Hal Jordan / Green Lantern, to kickstart the shared universe, but those plans were discarded following the film's critical and commercial failure. Despite a mixed critical reception, Man of Steel was a financial success, and Warner Bros. unveiled plans for a follow-up film featuring Batman and Superman at San Diego Comic-Con (SDCC) in July 2013, one month after the film's release. The follow-up's title was later revealed to be Batman v Superman: Dawn of Justice (2016).

By October 2012, Warner Bros. had restarted development on a Justice League film as work on The Flash and Wonder Woman adaptations continued to stall, with Will Beall attached as screenwriter. Goyer was hired to replace Beall in June 2013, before being replaced himself by Chris Terrio the next year, and Snyder was locked in to direct in April 2014. Casting for the other Justice League members took place throughout 2013, 2014, and 2015, with Ben Affleck set to play Bruce Wayne / Batman, Gal Gadot set to play Diana Prince / Wonder Woman, Jason Momoa set to play Arthur Curry / Aquaman, Ezra Miller set to play Barry Allen / The Flash, and Ray Fisher set to play Victor Stone / Cyborg.

In October 2014, Warner Bros. announced a slate of 11 films set in their shared DC universe: Suicide Squad (2016), Wonder Woman (2017), Justice League Part One (2017), The Flash (2018), Aquaman (2018), Shazam! (2019), Justice League Part Two (2019), Cyborg (2020), Green Lantern Corps (2020), a sequel to Man of Steel, and a Batman film. Snyder, the de facto head of the franchise, was to direct both Justice League films, later shortening Part One title to simply Justice League. The Flash and Cyborg both suffered multiple delays, with the former eventually securing a 2023 release date. The franchise, which had no name, was humorously dubbed the "DC Extended Universe" (DCEU) by Keith Staskiewicz of Entertainment Weekly in July 2015, which became widely used to refer to DC's live-action Justice League franchise over the years under the erroneous assumption that the name was legitimate. Warner Bros. began using the term officially in 2020.

2016–2017: Geoff Johns and Jon Berg 

Despite strong opening weekend box office numbers, Batman v Superman was lambasted by critics and ultimately performed below expectations. In response, Warner Bros. established DC Films to consolidate oversight of the franchise, not dissimilar to the Marvel Studios division led by Kevin Feige, the studio behind the Marvel Cinematic Universe (MCU) media franchise. Johns, the chief creative officer of DC, and Warner Bros. executive vice president Jon Berg were appointed to co-lead the new division. DC Films would not be fully autonomous, as Johns reported to DC Entertainment president Diane Nelson and Berg reported to Warner Bros. president of creative development Greg Silverman. Charles Roven, who had produced every DC film since Batman Begins, was relegated to the administrative position of executive producer. Silverman was ousted from his role in December, with Toby Emmerich promoted to president and chief content officer in his place. By January 2017, Johns and Berg reported to Emmerich.

Hoping to avert another Batman v Superman-esque disaster, DC Films made swift attempts to course-correct the DCEU, with the goal of setting a more light-hearted tone. Director David Ayer was ordered to perform extensive reshoots and re-editing for Suicide Squad based on rewritten material from Johns, resulting in a theatrical cut that vastly differed from Ayer's original vision. Warner Bros. was similarly unhappy with Justice League despite Snyder's considerable efforts to lighten its tone, and Warner Bros. Entertainment CEO Kevin Tsujihara dispatched Johns and Berg to "babysit" Snyder. Joss Whedon, who previously directed the MCU crossover films Marvel's The Avengers (2012) and Avengers: Age of Ultron (2015), was brought in by Johns to assist in rewrites and reshoots, but his power grew exponentially and Snyder eventually "lost the will to fight" during deliberations over the script. Johns also performed a rewrite of Wonder Woman with director Patty Jenkins.

In May 2017, Snyder stepped down from directorial duties on Justice League to cope with his daughter Autumn's suicide, and Whedon assumed his position to oversee post-production and complete the film. Whedon made significant alterations to Snyder's nearly-complete cut, reshooting much of the film with 80 pages of new material while deleting a large number of sequences that had already been filmed. These efforts failed to produce Warner Bros.' desired effect, with Suicide Squad and Justice League both panned by critics. While Suicide Squad was a box-office success, Justice League became a box-office bomb and lost the studio an estimated $60 million. Wonder Woman was released several months prior to Justice League to critical and commercial success. By the end of the year, development on the Man of Steel sequel was in limbo.

2018–2022: Walter Hamada

Justice League fallout 
In the aftermath of Justice League, Berg departed DC Films, and he was replaced by Walter Hamada in January 2018. Chantal Nong was also appointed vice president of DC Films. Johns stepped down from his position in June, leaving Hamada solely in command. Warner Bros. now sought to de-emphasize the DCEU's shared nature, with Nelson and Tsujihara stating that future DCEU films would concentrate on individual character stories rather than maintaining a sense of interconnectivity. As such, Justice League Part Two was delayed indefinitely. Under Hamada's leadership, the studio severed ties with Snyder, who had also planned a third Justice League film after Part Two to conclude his five-film arc that began with Man of Steel.

Affleck had signed on to direct his solo Batman film in April 2016, and the film's title was revealed to be The Batman, but he stepped down from the role in January 2017, with Matt Reeves hired in his place. Affleck departed from the film outright in January 2019, allowing Reeves to remove the film's connections to the DCEU. The Batman (2022) ultimately served as a reboot of the Batman film series, starring Robert Pattinson in the titular role and intended to launch its own franchise. Affleck attributed his decision to retire from the role to his negative experience shooting Justice League, adding that his friend and fellow actor Matt Damon was a "principal influence in that decision". In August 2020, Affleck was confirmed to reprise his role as Batman for a final time in The Flash in a limited capacity, with Michael Keaton set to return as his version of the character from the 1989–1997 Batman films. After The Flash, Keaton was scheduled to reprise his role in Batgirl (2022).

Immediately after the release of Justice League, Snyder's fans began calling for Warner Bros. to release Snyder's original cut prior to Whedon's contributions, dubbed the "Snyder Cut". These calls soon ballooned into a years-long campaign with fans heavily promoting the hashtag #ReleaseTheSnyderCut, with the support of several Justice League cast members, though industry experts considered it unlikely for Warner Bros. to release said cut. In July 2020, Fisher accused Whedon of abusive behavior on set during his reshoots for Justice League, claims that were corroborated by Gadot and Momoa. Criticizing Hamada for allegedly harboring Whedon, Fisher declared he would not return as Cyborg unless Hamada stepped down, leading to the Cyborg film and Fisher's planned appearance in The Flash being shelved.

In September 2018, Cavill was reported to have parted ways with Warner Bros., and Emmerich commissioned a search for a new actor to portray Superman. Superman proceeded to make a headless cameo in Shazam! via a body double. Development on the Man of Steel sequel had stagnated by May 2020, though Cavill was said to have engaged in talks to return as his character in future DCEU projects. In February 2021, Ta-Nehisi Coates was revealed to be writing a new Superman film set in the DCEU and produced by J. J. Abrams, expected to cast a Black actor as Superman. However, similar to The Batman, the film's connections to the DCEU were later dropped, placing it in a separate continuity.

New ventures 
In October 2018, James Gunn was hired to direct a standalone sequel to Suicide Squad, later titled The Suicide Squad (2021). This came after Gunn's dismissal from his role as director of the MCU film Guardians of the Galaxy Vol. 3 (2023), amid the resurfacing of offensive remarks made by him on Twitter years prior. Aquaman and Shazam! both enjoyed successes critically and commercially, while Suicide Squad spin-off Birds of Prey (2020), Wonder Woman sequel Wonder Woman 1984 (2020), and The Suicide Squad all underperformed at the box office, in part due to the COVID-19 pandemic. Green Lantern Corps, which had been languishing in development hell, was no longer in active development by 2019. The DCEU expanded to television in 2022 with HBO Max's Peacemaker (2022–present), a spin-off to The Suicide Squad helmed by Gunn which garnered favorable reviews from critics. The Justice League makes a cameo appearance in the first-season finale, "It's Cow or Never", with Miller and Momoa reprising their roles, Superman and Wonder Woman appearing via silhouette, and Batman and Cyborg absent per Warner Bros.' request.

In May 2020, WarnerMedia announced that a director's cut of Justice League, titled Zack Snyder's Justice League (2021), would be released on its recently launched HBO Max streaming service, with several actors returning for additional photography to finish the film. Zack Snyder's Justice League, which is four hours long and not canon to the DCEU, received mixed reviews from critics, who generally viewed it as superior to Whedon's theatrical cut. Emboldened by their campaign's success, Snyder's fans now urged Warner Bros. to restore Snyder's original vision for the DCEU, employing the hashtag #RestoreTheSnyderVerse, and release Ayer's original cut of Suicide Squad prior to Johns' contributions, employing the hashtag #ReleaseTheAyerCut.

By 2021, Warner Bros. had once again shifted their stance on interconnectivity, with Warner Bros. Entertainment CEO Ann Sarnoff now stating that future DCEU projects would be "more connected". Hamada said that DC Films was interested in developing spin-off series to DCEU films on HBO Max, and the platform began planning multiple series featuring Justice League Dark members in collaboration with Abrams, with the goal of eventually culminating these projects in a crossover miniseries. In addition to The Batman, Hamada also greenlit Joker (2019), directed by Todd Phillips and starring Joaquin Phoenix as Arthur Fleck / Joker, which is not set in the DCEU. The film went on to receive critical acclaim, becoming a box-office success and leading to a sequel, Joker: Folie à Deux (2024).

Warner Bros. Discovery 
In April 2022, Discovery, Inc. completed its acquisition of WarnerMedia from AT&T, forming Warner Bros. Discovery (WBD). Former Discovery CEO David Zaslav became president and CEO of the new company, and he immediately began searching for a "creative and strategic czar" akin to Feige to establish a "coherent creative and brand strategy" at DC. Zaslav desired to prioritize theatrical releases over direct-to-streaming content, and a planned HBO Max film centered around the Wonder Twins was canceled the next month due to Zaslav's concerns over its costly production budget. In June, Michael De Luca and Pamela Abdy were selected as interim co-CEOs and co-chairpersons of Warner Bros. Pictures, succeeding Emmerich. The same month, The Flash was expected to be Miller's last DCEU appearance, following a string of controversial incidents and arrests involving a mentally-unstable Miller, while Amber Heard, who portrayed Mera in Aquaman and Justice League, found herself embroiled in controversy after losing a highly publicized defamation lawsuit against her ex-husband, actor Johnny Depp. An online petition to have Heard removed from Aquaman sequel Aquaman and the Lost Kingdom (2023) received over 4 million signatures, but Hamada and producer Peter Safran vehemently denied claims that her role had been reduced.

In July, rumors circulated that Cavill would make an appearance at SDCC 2022 to announce his return as Superman in Black Adam (2022), a spin-off to Shazam! which Dwayne Johnson had been attached to star and produce since 2014. When this did not happen, Johnson was booed onstage by panel attendees. After this episode, Johnson approached Hamada and requested his permission to film a Superman cameo with Cavill. Hamada refused, citing Coates and Abrams' film, and Johnson turned to De Luca and Abdy, who overruled Hamada. Cavill, who had previously expressed his desire to return to the role of Superman, filmed the cameo shortly thereafter, in addition to another cameo for The Flash. Meanwhile, Affleck returned to film a cameo as Batman for Aquaman and the Lost Kingdom, reportedly replacing a planned appearance by Keaton. In October, a sequel to Man of Steel was revealed to have re-entered development, with Roven set to produce.

In August, Zaslav made the unprecedented decision to cancel Batgirl, which had just concluded principal photography and been scheduled for an HBO Max release. According to TheWrap, the move stemmed from Zaslav's dissatisfaction with the film's quality, but Variety, The Hollywood Reporter, and Deadline Hollywood maintained that the cancellation was part of the studio's cost-cutting measures. Hamada, who was not consulted, was upset by the news and considered resigning, but agreed to remain on until Black Adam release. He had plans for a crossover event based on the comic book storyline "Crisis on Infinite Earths" (1985). Rolling Stone reported that a film centered on Kara Zor-El / Supergirl, the cousin of Superman who is set to appear in The Flash, was also unlikely to move forward under Zaslav's regime. During WBD's quarterly earnings investor call two days after Batgirl cancellation, Zaslav described his goal to "reset" DC and develop a ten-year plan for the DCEU, mentioning Feige and Marvel Studios as his blueprint. Batman, Superman, and Wonder Woman were named as the key players of his vision.

As Hamada prepared for his exit, Zaslav began searching for a successor, with Dan Lin said to be among those in contention. Johnson took on an advisory role for the DCEU, expressing confidence in the future of the franchise under the direction of Zaslav, De Luca, and Abdy. Johnson was ecstatic about his future in the DCEU and framed Black Adam as the cornerstone of a new chapter in the franchise, frequently teasing a showdown between Teth-Adam / Black Adam and Cavill's Superman. Johnson pitched a "multiyear plan" involving the two characters to Zaslav, but his relationship with the studio gradually deteriorated due to executives' reluctance to meet Johnson's demands. Despite Cavill's appearance in Black Adam mid-credits scene drawing a positive response from some audiences, the film was poorly received and became a box-office bomb, and a sequel was reported to be unlikely.

2022–present: James Gunn and Peter Safran 

In October 2022, Gunn and Safran were hired as the co-CEOs of DC Studios, the successor to DC Films, effective November 1. The duo had been recommended to Zaslav by De Luca. Gunn and Safran have signaled their intention to overhaul DC's film and television properties, with Zaslav indicating that DC's various media offerings across film, television, animation, video games, and other mediums would be united into one franchise. Gunn further stated that he and Safran would have an open mind to input from fans, condemned the vitriol directed to him by discontent DCEU fans, and promised that they would receive no studio interference unlike their predecessors. He has cited the animated series Justice League Unlimited (2004–2006) and Young Justice (2010–2022) as inspirations for his and Safran's slate of projects. The duo spent the remaining year finalizing their plans for the DCEU, which spanned eight to ten years, presenting them to Zaslav in December.

The same month, The Hollywood Reporter reported that a third Wonder Woman film which had been in development from Jenkins and Gadot had been canceled due to it not being in line with Gunn and Safran's plans, and that DC Studios was considering ending Momoa's run as Aquaman, with the potential of recasting him in a different role. Days later, Cavill backtracked his previous announcement that he was returning as Superman, which had been made in coordination with De Luca and Abdy. Instead, Gunn revealed that he was writing a new Superman film centered on a younger version of the character, and the role would be recast. Cavill and Gadot's cameos in The Flash were deleted, and the Man of Steel sequel was once again shelved. Johnson confirmed that Black Adam was not part of Gunn and Safran's immediate plans, and a planned Batman film starring Keaton and based on the Batman Beyond (1999–2001) animated series was scrapped. Momoa stated that he would continue to play Aquaman, but hinted at the possibility of him taking on other roles simultaneously. Actor Dave Bautista, who worked with Gunn on the Guardians films, said that Gunn and Safran intended to reboot the DCEU. Variety reported that Gunn and Safran's new universe would be a "broad but not blanket reset" for the franchise.

In January 2023, Gunn and Safran announced their slate of ten DC adaptations, which included: the animated HBO Max series Creature Commandos; the HBO Max series Waller, which serves as a spinoff to Peacemaker; the film Superman: Legacy (2025), Gunn's Superman film; the HBO Max series Lanterns, unrelated to Greg Berlanti's Green Lantern project that was previously in development; the film The Authority; the HBO Max series Paradise Lost, which serves as a prequel to the Wonder Woman films; the film The Brave and the Bold, featuring a new Batman; the HBO Max series Booster Gold; the film Supergirl: Woman of Tomorrow; and the film Swamp Thing. These projects were to be part of the DC Universe (DCU), a new franchise which serves as the spiritual successor to the DCEU. Gunn further revealed that The Flash would "reset" the DCEU continuity, essentially serving as a soft reboot. Any projects produced by DC Studios that were not set in the DCEU or DCU, including the Joker and The Batman films, would henceforth be labeled as "DC Elseworlds" properties.

Shazam! sequel Shazam! Fury of the Gods (2023), The Flash, Blue Beetle (2023), and Aquaman and the Lost Kingdom are scheduled to be released as planned as the final four DCEU films, which will segue into Gunn and Safran's slate. Gunn stated that while neither Affleck's Batman nor Cavill's Superman would be a part of the DCU, he and Safran had offered to allow Gadot, Momoa, Miller, and Billy Batson / Shazam actor Zachary Levi to continue playing their DCEU characters. Fury of the Gods had originally been intended to serve as the DCEU's third course correction, and features a cameo appearance by Gadot. Johnson was said to have declined cameos in both Fury of the Gods and The Flash.

References

Further reading 

 
 

DC Extended Universe
History of film of the United States